A Teacher's Oath is an oath taken in some countries by teachers.

In 1993, the German educator  designed the Socratic Oath, which is supposed to be a set of professional guidelines for educators,  teachers and paedagogues. In 2022, after the COVI19 pandemic effects some dramatic changes in the world as a whole and in the education system in partial the German educator Klaus Zierer published a renewal of the Socratic oath, which is based on the research of the educator John Hattie and has not only a theoretical approach but also an empirical base.

Today there are many different versions of the Teacher's Oath, for example the Comenius Oath in Finland, Teachers' Oath Taking in Philippines, Abdul Kalam Teachers Oath in India, Teachers Pledge in Singapore and Betimi i Mësuesit in Kosovo.

Since 1863, nearly two-thirds of US states have adopted loyalty oaths for teachers. The Massachusetts Teachers' Oath was a loyalty oath required to teach in Massachusetts from 1935 to 1967.

Socratic Oath

Other versions 
As a teacher, I commit myself to directing all my feelings, thoughts and actions in my profession towards the well-being of the children entrusted to me.

I commit myself to the children,

- to challenge and support each child according to his or her potential and level of development,

- not to leave any child behind or to write them off, no matter what the reasons are,

- to take the failure of the children entrusted to me again and again as an opportunity for new ways of teaching,

- to see mistakes as an opportunity, not as a flaw,

- to set challenges in the educational process so that underachallenge and overchallenge do not occur,

- to look for, pick up and awaken motivations,

- to enter into dialogue again and again, to give and receive feedback, to ask questions and to listen,

- to attribute a serving function to subjects in the educational process,

- to address and stimulate all areas of the personality,

- to give confidence in the world and in oneself and to make it visible on a daily basis,

- to understand and shape the class and the school as a welcoming place,

- to provide for an appreciative, fear-free and educationally effective atmosphere and relationship, and

- to stand up for the physical, mental and spiritual integrity of the children entrusted to me.

I commit myself to the parents

- to communicate at eye level and to build up an educational partnership,

- to understand the educational process of the children as a common task,

- not only to be prepared to talk to them regularly, but also to actively seek contact with them, and

- to take their assessments of the children's educational success and progress seriously and to combine them with their own views.

I commit myself to my colleagues,

- to share my experiences in education and teaching and to use them as a basis for collegial professionalisation,

- to share and reflect together on the mistakes made every day,

- to reflect back on successful moments in school and to give mutual recognition, and

- to allow everyone their individual perspective on school and teaching while working towards a shared vision.

I commit myself to the educational public,

- to accept the educational mandate and to implement it at all times,

- not only to impart knowledge and skills, but to focus on and promote all areas of the personality,

- to subordinate all subjects to the well-being of the child and thus to the educational mission,

- to be loyal but not blind to official guidelines,

- to implement everything that serves the best interests of the children and to reject everything that is contrary to the best interests of the child,

- to critically question, and if necessary publicly denounce and reject, any interests and demands on school and teaching that are not primarily in the best interests of the child, and

- to give a voice to children and their right to education in public discourse.

I commit myself to society,

- to see respect for human dignity as the basis and goal of school and education,

- to teach the principles of our democracy and to defend them in school and in teaching,

- to see school as a place of reproduction and innovation of social values,

- to use my pedagogical freedom to place current issues at the centre of everyday school life, and

- to be not only reactive but also proactive towards the further development of our society.

To myself I commit myself,

- to justify my actions at all times, to discuss them critically and constructively and to reflect on them conscientiously,

- to regularly develop my professional, pedagogical and didactic competences,

- regularly reflect on my professional attitudes, and

- to always fulfil my role as a role model to the best of my knowledge and belief.

I confirm what has been said by my willingness to be measured at all times against the standards that emanate from this commitment.

~ Klaus Zierer - 2022

See also 
Hippocratic Oath
Massachusetts Teachers' Oath
Socrates
Teachers day
International Day of Education

References

Further reading 
 Oaths of loyalty for teachers American federation of teachers, 1935
 Anthony J. Diekema:Academic Freedom and Christian Scholarship Wm. B. Eerdmans Publishing, 2000, 
 Hentig, Hartmut von: Die Schule neu denken. München u. Wien (Hanser) 1993. S. 258-259) 
 Reutter, E. Edmund, Jr., and Robert R. Hamilton. The Law of Public Education. 2d ed. Mineola, N.Y.: Foundation Press, 1976.
 Zierer, Klaus: Do We Need a Renewal of the Socratic Oath? Education Today. 04/29/2022 https://www.educationtoday.com.au/news-detail/Do-We-Need-a-Renewal-of-the-Socratic-Oath-5599

Philosophy of education
Oaths
Pedagogy
Codes of conduct
Professional ethics